Robbie Koenig (born 5 July 1971) is a retired professional tennis player from South Africa who is now a tennis commentator and analyst. He won five doubles titles and reached the semifinals of the 1998 US Open men's doubles competition. Koenig works as a tennis broadcaster for a host of TV channels around the world, covering most notably the ATP Masters 1000 events, the Australian Open, US Open and Wimbledon (Radio) as well as the premier online tennis channel of TennisTV.com

Playing career
Koenig achieved a career-high singles ranking of World No. 262, notably reaching the third round of Washington in 1992. He had wins early on in his singles career over the likes of Tim Henman, Pat Rafter, Yevgeny Kafelnikov and Felix Mantilla. Most of his success, however, came in doubles. He won 5 titles (with 6 further finals), reaching a career-high doubles ranking of World No. 28 in May 2003. As well as his US Open doubles semi-finals appearance in 1998, Koenig reached the round-of-16 twice at Wimbledon in 1998 and 1999. He was also a quarter-finalist on 3 other occasions at the US Open in 1997, 2001 and 2004. In Mixed Doubles he reached the semi-finals of the Australian Open and Wimbledon in 2001 and the US Open in 2002.
He also represented South Africa in Davis Cup on four occasions and was captained by 1985 Wimbledon finalist, Kevin Curren.

Commentating career
Koenig is known for his commentary on the ATP World Tour at their Masters 1000 events matches broadcast on Tennis Channel as well as the online tennis broadcast site TennisTV, often as part of a commentating duo alongside Jason Goodall. Often regarded as “the voice of tennis”, he is a regular at both the Australian Open and US Open. He can also be heard on Amazon Prime UK, Fox Sports in Australia, Star Sports in Asia, ESPN International as well as SuperSport in South Africa where he co-hosts during the Grand Slam events. He strayed commentating in 2007 for ATP Media. 
Koenig co-hosted and commentated on ‘The Match in Africa’ where Roger Federer and Rafa Nadal played in front of the biggest live tennis audience ever at the time!
Netflix to have used  good deal of his commentary for their “Break Point” docu-series.

ATP career finals

Doubles: 11 (5 titles, 6 runner-ups)

ATP Challenger and ITF Futures finals

Doubles: 5 (3–2)

Performance timelines

Singles

Doubles

Mixed doubles

References

External links
 
 
 

1971 births
Living people
South African people of British descent
Sportspeople from Durban

South African expatriates in the United States
South African male tennis players
Tennis commentators
White South African people